Lakshmi Kalyanam may refer to:
 Lakshmi Kalyanam (1968 film)
 Lakshmi Kalyanam (2007 film)
 Lakshmi Kalyanam (TV series)